Dristor is a major metro station in Bucharest. It is located on the Bd. Camil Ressu – Șoseaua Mihai Bravu – Calea Dudești junction.
The part of the station at the end of metro line 1 is called Dristor 2; the other half of the station is Dristor 1, where trains of metro line M1/M3 pass through. Having two separately named parts of the station can cause confusion for people because both parts of the station have metro line M1 either passing through, which occurs at Dristor 1, or terminating and beginning service at Dristor 2. Signs guide passenger to either terminals.

Dristor 1 is where M3 service and through M1 service stops. It is above Dristor 2 and has one island platform.

Dristor 2 has one island platform and is the terminus of line M1. A passageway at the south end of the platform connects it to Dristor 1.

The station was opened on 28 December 1981 as part of the section between Timpuri Noi and Republica. On 17 August 1989, the section between Dristor and Gara de Nord was opened.

References

Bucharest Metro stations
Railway stations opened in 1981
1981 establishments in Romania